Homegrown Music Festival has been held annually in Wellington, New Zealand, since 2008. It showcases artists from New Zealand.

2008 

Saturday 26 April 2008

Line-up

2009 

The 2009 festival was held on 14 March 2009. It was set across 5 stages along the waterfront and included 35 of New Zealand's premier bands and DJs.

Line-up

2010 
The 2010 edition was called Vodafone Homegrown after the sponsors, Vodafone. It was held on 20 February, with the line-up announced on 14 September 2009.

Line-up

2011 
The 2011 edition was named Jim Beam Homegrown after the sponsors, Jim Beam, and was held on 5 March 2011. It had a pop and RnB stage for the first time and had more acts than previous years.

Line-up

This was Blindspott's first gig since reforming.

This was one of Nesian Mystik's last ever gigs.

2012 

The 2012 edition was on 18 February 2012. For the fifth consecutive year the festival was a sell out (17,000 tickets).

Line-up

External links
http://www.homegrown.net.nz

Tourist attractions in Wellington City
Electronic music festivals in New Zealand
Music festivals established in 2008
Rock festivals in New Zealand
Autumn events in New Zealand
Festivals in Wellington